John Patrick Amedori is an American actor and musician. He is known for playing Gabe Mitchell in Dear White People.

Amedori appeared in the film The Vatican Tapes (2015). He has also appeared in a number of television shows, including Law & Order, Nip/Tuck, Joan of Arcadia and Ghost Whisperer, as well as a part in the films The Butterfly Effect and Stick It. In 2006, Amedori starred in Fox's drama series Vanished, and in 2008 was cast as Aaron Rose in Gossip Girl as a love interest of Serena van der Woodsen and the stepbrother of Blair Waldorf.

Career 
John Patrick Amedori made his acting debut in 1998 in D Minus. In 2000, he landed his role in Almost Famous by sending Cameron Crowe a videotape of himself playing the electric guitar. The director liked it so much that he wrote up a part just for John. In 2004 he appeared as a young Evan in The Butterfly Effect. In 2006 he earned starring roles in the television show Vanished, as well as the films Stick It and Love is the Drug.

In 2008, John Patrick was cast as Aaron Rose, a love interest of Serena van der Woodsen in Gossip Girl. In 2010 he appeared in Scott Pilgrim vs. the World. In 2012 he was cast in Billy Bob Thornton's Jayne Mansfield's Car.

In 2015, he earned a reoccurring role on the television show Hindsight and starred in the film The Vatican Tapes. In 2016 appeared in multiple episodes of Aquarius.

Since 2017 John Patrick has starred as Gabe Mitchell in the Netflix series Dear White People.

John Patrick has also appeared in multiple episodes of The Good Doctor as Dash.

Filmography

References

External links
 
 

20th-century American male actors
21st-century American male actors
21st-century American male singers
21st-century American singers
1987 births
American male child actors
American male film actors
American male television actors
Living people
Male actors from Baltimore
Musicians from Baltimore
Singers from Maryland